Andreas Holm (29 May 1906 – 13 January 2003) was a Norwegian politician for the Centre Party.

He served as a deputy representative to the Norwegian Parliament from Aust-Agder during the terms  1954–1957 and 1961–1965.

References

1906 births
2003 deaths
Centre Party (Norway) politicians
Deputy members of the Storting
Aust-Agder politicians